Arend and Arent are primarily Low German patronymic surnames from the given name Arend. The Dutch surnames "Van den Arend" and "Den Arend" means "(from) the eagle" and have a toponymic origin. Notable people with the surname include:

Arend
Anthony Clark Arend (born 1958), American legal scholar
Christophe Arend (born 1975), French politician
Dieter Arend (1914–?), German rower
Geoffrey Arend (born 1978), American actor
Harry Arend (1903–1966), justice of the Alaska Supreme Court
Sylvain Arend (1902–1992), Belgian astronomer
Vivian Arend (born 1965), Canadian novelist
Willy Arend (1876–1964), German track cyclist
Arent
Benno von Arent (1898–1956), German Nazi stage designer and architect
Eddi Arent (1925–2013), German actor and comedian
Patrice M. Arent (born 1956), Utah Democratic politician
Den Arend
 (1903–1982), Dutch composer
Lucien den Arend (born 1943), Dutch sculptor

See also
Arends, Dutch surname of the same origin
Arend (given name)

References

Low German surnames
Patronymic surnames